Andrew John King (born 30 March 1970) is an English former footballer.

Career

King started his career with Reading in June 1988 after coming through their youth team and played one game in the 1988–89 season. He moved onto Oxford City after leaving Reading in 1989.

References

1970 births
Living people
People from Thatcham
English footballers
Association football forwards
Association football defenders
Reading F.C. players
Oxford City F.C. players
English Football League players